The women's 4 × 400 metres relay event at the 1999 All-Africa Games was held on 18 September 1999 at the Johannesburg Stadium.

Results

References

4 x 400